Peperomia verediana is a species of plant from the genus Peperomia. It was discovered by William Trelease in 1936.

Etymology
Verediana came from the Spanish word "Vereda". Vereda defines a scattered settlement in Latin America.

Distribution
Peperomia verediana is endemic to Loreto, Peru. Specimens were collected by Llewelyn Williams in Caballococha, Loreto.

Peru
Loreto
Caballococha
Amazon River

Description
It is a medium-sized glabrous herb with stems 2-3 millimeters thick. Leaves alternate from broadest near the base, having a slightly pointed tip, rounded at the base, and minutely cordate at the margin. Leaves are 5.5-6.5 centimeters long, and 3.5-4 centimeters wide. Petioles are 2 centimeters long. Inflorescence is not present in this species.

References

verediana
Flora of Peru
Plants described in 1936
Taxa named by William Trelease